The 1980 United States Senate election in North Carolina was held on November 4, 1980, as part of the nationwide elections to the Senate. Incumbent Democratic U.S. Senator Robert Morgan ran for reelection to a second term, but narrowly lost to Republican John East.

Primaries

Democratic 
Robert Morgan was unopposed for the Democratic nomination.

Republican 
John East was unopposed for the Republican nomination.

General election

Candidates 
 John East (R), Professor at East Carolina University
 Robert Morgan (D), incumbent U.S. Senator

Results

See also 
 1980 United States Senate elections

References 

1980
North Carolina
1980 North Carolina elections